Judith K. Pringle (born 1952) is a New Zealand organisational/social psychology academic. She is currently a full professor at the Auckland University of Technology.

Academic career

After a BSc in psychology and an OE in Asia and Europe, Pringle returned to the University of Otago for a 1983 PhD in social psychology titled  'The definition, structure and measurement of social skill.'  After teaching at Deakin University and the University of Auckland she move to Auckland University of Technology.

Much of Pringle's current work relates to gender and diversity in the workplace.

Selected works 
 Arthur, Michael, Kerr Inkson, and Judith Pringle. The new careers: Individual action and economic change. Sage, 1999.
 Inkson, Kerr, Michael B. Arthur, Judith Pringle, and Sean Barry. "Expatriate assignment versus overseas experience: Contrasting models of international human resource development." Journal of world business 32, no. 4 (1997): 351–368.
 Pringle, Judith, and Mary Mallon. "Challenges for the boundaryless career odyssey." International Journal of Human Resource Management 14, no. 5 (2003): 839–853.
 Prasad, Pushkala, Judith K. Pringle, and Alison M. Konrad. "Examining the contours of workplace diversity." Handbook of workplace diversity (2006): 1-22.
 Konrad, Alison M., Pushkala Prasad, and Judith Pringle, eds. Handbook of workplace diversity. Sage, 2005.

References

External links
  
 
 

Living people
1952 births
New Zealand women academics
Academic staff of the Auckland University of Technology
Academic staff of Deakin University
Academic staff of the University of Auckland
University of Otago alumni
New Zealand psychologists
New Zealand women psychologists
Social psychologists